Parliamentary elections were held in Iraq on 12 May 2018. The elections decided the 329 members of the Council of Representatives, the country's unicameral legislature, who in turn will elect the Iraqi president and prime minister. The Iraqi parliament ordered a manual recount of the results on 6 June 2018. On 10 June 2018, a storage site in Baghdad housing roughly half of the ballots from the May parliamentary election caught fire.

In October 2018, Adil Abdul-Mahdi was selected as prime minister five months after the elections.

This election would be the last held under the Webster/Sainte-Laguë method of proportional representation, as electoral reforms passed in 2019 amid the 2019–2021 Iraqi protests created a district-based system, and sought to have representatives represent more local voices (as opposed to the entire governorate they were previously elected from), reduce deadlocks resulting from inconclusive coalition talks, as well as stop infighting amongst list members and a myriad of small lists from siphoning off votes and failing to meet the electoral threshold. It would also prevent parties from running on unified lists, which had previously led some to easily sweep all the seats in a particular governorate.

Background
The elections took place six months after a non-binding independence referendum in Iraqi Kurdistan, in which 93% voted in favour of independence. In retaliation, the Iraqi government led by Haider al-Abadi closed Erbil International Airport, seized control of all border crossings between Kurdistan and neighbouring countries and, with the help of the Hashd al-Shaabi militias, militarily seized control of disputed territories, including the oil-rich city of Kirkuk. Nonetheless, Iraqi politicians called for dialogue with the Iraqi Kurdistan government and force them to formally annul the results.

The elections were originally scheduled for September 2017, but were delayed by six months due to the civil war with the Islamic State which ended in December 2017 with the recapture of their remaining territories. The largest Sunni Arab majority coalition, the Muttahidoon (Uniters for Reform), called for a further six month's delay to allow displaced voters to return to their homes. A Sunni Arab MP described holding the elections at this time as a "military coup against the political process". However, the Supreme Court ruled that delaying the elections would be unconstitutional.

Electoral system
Members of the Council of Representatives are elected through the open list form of party-list proportional representation, using the 18 governorates of Iraq as the constituencies. The counting system uses the modified Sainte-Laguë method with a divisor of 1.7 which is considered as a disadvantage to smaller parties. Eight seats remain reserved for minority groups at the national level: five for Assyrians and one each for Mandaeans, Yazidis, and Shabaks. However, the Council of Representatives voted on 11 February 2018, to add an extra seat for minorities, in the Wasit Governorate for Feyli Kurds, making the total number of parliamentarians equal to 329.

In January, the Supreme Court ruled that the representation for Yazidis should be increased, although it is unclear whether this change will be implemented in time for these elections.

International voting

The Independent High Electoral Commission announced that Iraqis living outside of Iraq can vote in any of the 130 voting stations that were set up in 21 countries. 18 of the stations were in the United States, 15 in Sweden, 15 in Turkey, 14 in Iran, 13 in Jordan, 8 in the United Kingdom, 8 in Australia, 7 in Germany, 7 in Canada, 5 in Egypt, 4 in Denmark, 2 in Lebanon, and one each in France, Syria, Finland, Belgium, Austria, Norway, and New Zealand.

Election day

A curfew was declared by prime minister Al-Abadi from midnight Friday to 7 pm Saturday in all governorates except Baghdad, where the curfew started at noon Friday. A 24-hour closure of all airports and other border crossing was also implemented. The Iraqi airspace was open later on the day as well as the lifting of the curfew. Election day in Iraq was extremely successful from a security aspect, as no attacks were registered anywhere in the country.

Seat allocation 

Seats are allocated to governorates as follows:

Source:

Campaign

A total of 6,904 candidates participated in the elections, representing parties:

Alliances
As of 26 December 2017, a total of 204 parties had registered to contest the elections. The deadline for registering coalitions was 11 January 2018. A total of 27 coalitions were registered by the deadline, grouping 143 political parties, with registered parties not part of a coalition also free to contest separately.

The ruling State of Law Coalition, which won the last election in 2014 with 92 seats, contested the election with two separate coalitions. Prime Minister Haider al-Abadi entered the election as head of a coalition called "Victory" (a reference to the victory over Daesh); his predecessor, Vice President Nouri al-Maliki, headed the State of Law list. Members of the Dawa Party, which they both come from, were free to support either list.

Leading members of the Hashd al-Shaabi (Popular Mobilization Forces), mainly Shiite Arab militias who fought alongside the Iraqi army to defeat Daesh from 2014 to 2017, formed an alliance to contest the election. The Fatah Alliance included the Badr Organisation, Asa'ib Ahl al-Haq, Kata'ib Hezbollah and Kata'ib al-Imam Ali—all key components of the Hashd. The Badr Organisation, headed by Hadi Al-Amiri, which had 22 seats, was previously part of the ruling State of Law Coalition from which it announced its withdrawal in December 2017. The Fatah Alliance agreed to run jointly with al-Abadi's Nasr al-Iraq (Victory of Iraq) list, but the agreement fell apart after only 24 hours, reportedly over Abadi's conditions.

Ammar al-Hakim, the leader of the Citizen Alliance, the third largest bloc in parliament, announced in July 2017 that he was leaving the veteran Shiite Islamist party, the Islamic Supreme Council of Iraq -– which he had led since the death of his father, Abdul Aziz al-Hakim –- and forming a new "non-Islamic national movement" called the National Wisdom Movement (al-Hikma). All but five of the 29 MPs from the Citizens Alliance joined Al-Hikma. The remaining members of the Citizen Alliance joined the Fatah Alliance.

Muqtada al-Sadr announced a joint list with the Iraqi Communist Party, called the Alliance towards Reforms. This built on previous collaboration with the Communists since 2016, when they held joint protests in Baghdad against corruption and sectarianism in government.

Kurdistan Region 
Within the Kurdish parties, there had been significant changes since the previous election with the death of both Jalal Talabani, the long-time leader of the Patriotic Union of Kurdistan, the second largest party, and the opposition leader Nawshirwan Mustafa. In September 2017, Barham Salih, a former prime minister of Iraqi Kurdistan and deputy leader of the PUK, announced that he was leaving the party and forming a new opposition party—the Coalition for Democracy and Justice. The party was seen to have the potential to change the Kurdish political landscape. He said he hoped to gather all the other opposition parties, including Gorran and Komal, to challenge the governing KDP–PUK alliance. The three parties formed a coalition called Nishtiman (Homeland) to run in the elections. The ruling KDP–PUK alliance have agreed to run again as a single list and all the Kurdish parties in Kirkuk have discussed running as a single list. However, the KDP announced they would boycott elections in Kirkuk and other areas they described as "under military occupation".

Sunni-majority areas 
Within the Sunni Arab parties, the main Uniters for Reform Coalition (Muttahidoon), led by Osama al-Nujaifi, which won 23 seats in 2014, is running again, although the Iraqi Islamic Party, led by Speaker of Parliament Salim Jabouri, has left this coalition to join up with former prime minister Ayad Allawi's Al-Wataniya and Salah al-Mutlak's Al-Arabiya. The combined list was called Al-Wataniya. Other parties as well have left the Muttahidoon coalition including the al-Hal Party and formed various alliances in the name of the provinces they ran in, such as Salahuddin Our Identity in Saladin Governorate, and Anbar Our Identity in Al Anbar Governorate and Baghdad Alliance in Baghdad.

Civil parties 
Within the nonsectarian parties who aim to establish a civil state, the main alliance formed is the Civilized Alliance, led by Faiq Al Sheikh Ali, which currently has 4 seats. The alliance consists of four liberal, non-sectarian, national parties, the People's Party for Reform, the Al-Etifak National Party, the National Civil Movement and Iraq's National Movement, and includes a number of independent figures. The Civil Democratic Alliance are also running in the elections as another major civil party.

Christian parties
Of the 329 seats in parliament, five are reserved for the country's Christian minority. One reserved seat is allotted for each of five governorates: Baghdad, Duhok, Erbil, Kirkuk and Nineveh. At the time of voting, only about 200,000 Christians remained in the country.

Attacks 
In early May 2018, ISIL claimed to have assassinated Faruq Zarzur al-Juburi, a candidate in the Iraqi elections. The attack reportedly took place in Mosul, outside al-Juburi's house. This was later on proven to be false; due to a family dispute, the candidate was killed by his son.

On election day, a roadside bomb in Kirkuk killed six members of Tribal Mobilization (ar) (a pro-government Sunni tribal force) and injured three police officers.

One Iraqi border guard was killed by a bomb in the outskirts of Khanaqin in Diyala on 13 May.

Two offices linked to Muqtada al-Sadr in Maysan were bombed on 15 May but there were no casualties since both offices were empty at the time. It is still unclear whether the attacks were a response to the parliamentary gains in the election made by Sadr's coalition.

On 16 May, a polling station in Kirkuk was reportedly under siege by gunmen pressuring them to change the results after the PUK was indicated to have won the province.

Results 
After the High Electoral Commission announced the results, there were claims of widespread fraud linked to the electronic counting of votes. The Council of Representatives held an emergency session and passed an amendment to the electoral law that cancelled the votes of internally-displaced and overseas voters and mandated a full manual recount for all other votes.

The Commission appealed to the Supreme Court. In a ruling on 21 June, the court upheld the full manual recount but struck down the cancellation of internally-displaced and overseas voters. The final results were released on 9 August, with only minor changes affecting five candidates and two parties.

By governorate

Baghdad Governorate (Including changes after manual recount)

Anbar Governorate

Babil Governorate

Basra Governorate

Dhi Qar Governorate

Diyala Governorate

Dohuk Governorate

Erbil Governorate

Karbala Governorate

Kirkuk Governorate

Maysan Governorate

Muthanna Governorate

Najaf Governorate

Nineveh Governorate

Al-Qādisiyyah Governorate

Saladin Governorate

Sulaymaniyah Governorate

Wasit Governorate

Maps

Government formation 

On 8 June 2018, a formal agreement was signed by the leaders of the Alliance towards Reforms (Saairun) and the National Coalition (Wataniya) to become the largest bloc in the Council of Representatives. The bloc is calling for economic reform, consolidation of democracy, and political decentralization. A spokesman for Wataniya said that the agreement would be a prelude to other forces joining the alliance, and that serious talks were underway with the National Wisdom Movement (Hikma), the Kurdistan Democratic Party, the Fatah Alliance, and the Decision Alliance (Muttahidoon) as an alliance of these six electoral coalitions would constitute a majority that could form a government.

Al-Sadr announced on 12 June that he had formed an alliance with Fatah, while maintaining an alliance with Al-Wataniya. Prime Minister Abadi later met with Al Sadr on 23 June. Al Sadr afterwards announced he had formed "a cross-sectarian, cross-ethnic alliance" with Abadi and that it would speed up the formation of a new government. Abadi also announced that the new alliance between his Victory Alliance's and Al Sadr's Alliance towards Reforms "is not in contrast to any other alliances either of the two lists have previously entered into with other blocs, rather, it flows in the same direction and same principles."

The final results of the election were announced on 9 August, starting the process to form the government. Parliament convened on 3 September, but were unable to elect a speaker due to rivalries between two blocs who both claimed to be the largest coalition, entitled to nominate the prime minister. Al-Abadi presented an alliance with Saairun, Wataniya, Hikma and other smaller lists who between then held a majority of seats. However, Fatah also claimed to have a majority, based on an alliance with State of Law and with members of Abadi's coalition who had defected.

Two weeks later parliament reconvened and elected a speaker in a secret ballot, with candidates from each of the rival blocs. Muhammad al-Halbusi, a Sunni Arab (as per the Iraqi tradition of muḥāṣaṣah) but backed by Fatah was elected.

At the same time, violent protests occurred in Basra and other cities in the south over polluted water—which had hospitalised tens of thousands of people—and the lack of reliable electricity. Religious leaders called for a new prime minister who hadn't been in government before. Abadi announced on 13 September 2018 that he would respect this call and not run for a second term as prime minister.

The vote for the president took place on 2 October. Previously, the president had always been a member of the second-largest Kurdish party, the Patriotic Union of Kurdistan, under an agreement with the Kurdistan Democratic Party whereby the KDP would be president of Iraqi Kurdistan. However, the KDP fielded a separate candidate, Fuad Hussein, insisting that they had the right to the Presidency as the largest party. Both candidates went to a vote in the parliament, with the PUK's Barham Salih winning. He immediately nominated independent Shi'ite Adil Abdul-Mahdi, a former oil minister seen as acceptable to all parties and to both Iran and the United States, as prime minister-designate.

References

Elections in Iraq
Iraq
2018 elections in Iraq
May 2018 events in Iraq